Yuquanying is a major traffic intersection in Beijing, linking the Jingkai Expressway with the southern part of the 3rd Ring Road. It is accessible via a connection road from Caihuying on the 2nd Ring Road.

Before it was changed to an overpass complex, Yuquanying was home to the Yuquanying Roundabout. Now, it is home to the massive Yuquanying Overpass instead.

Furniture shops are plenty in the surrounding area.

Yuquanying is also the starting point of the Jingkai Expressway.

Road transport in Beijing